Barrachois may refer to:
 Barrachois, Cape Breton County, Nova Scotia, Canada
 Barrachois, Colchester County, Nova Scotia, Canada